The Comateens were originally a new wave duo formed in 1978 in New York City by bassist/vocalist Nic North and guitarist Ramona Jan. Soon after, Lyn Byrd joined on vocals and synthesizer, and the duo became a trio. When Jan departed in 1980, North's brother Oliver joined on guitar, completing the final lineup.

They contributed two tracks to the influential Marty Thau Presents 2x5 compilation, and their debut album, the self-titled Comateens (1980), featured the band's original compositions alongside covers of "Summer in the City" (The Lovin' Spoonful), "TVC 15" (David Bowie), and the theme song from TV's The Munsters. Pictures on a String, their first album for Virgin Records, followed in 1983, yielding the dance club hit "Get Off My Case". In 1984 the band released their final album, Deal with It, which featured live drums played by Chuck Sabo.

The band split up in 1985. Oliver North died in 1987 of asthma-related heart failure due to a heroin overdose. In 1988 Nic North (now Nicholas West) and Lyn Byrd recorded an album, West & Byrd, together. In 1990 the duo, again under the name Comateens, recorded the song "A Place For Me", an English language adaptation of the Julien Clerc and Françoise Hardy song "Fais-moi une place", and it became a European hit. Virgin Records released a retrospective compilation of their music in 1991 called One By One: Best Of Comateens which has become a rare and much sought-after record among collectors of new wave music. In 1995, their video for "The Late Mistake" was mocked in a season five episode of Beavis and Butt-head called "Top O'The Mountain".

Discography

Albums
Comateens (1981)
Pictures on a String (1983)
Deal with It (1984)
Comateens (limited collectors edition) (2007)

Compilations
One by One - The Best of the Comateens (1991)

West & Byrd
West & Byrd (1988)

References

External links
 Official Site
 Comateens bio from Trouser Press
 Comateens discography on Discogs
 Comateens on AllMusic
 Comateens on Beavis and Butthead

American new wave musical groups
Musical groups from New York (state)
Musical groups established in 1978
1978 establishments in New York City